The 2000 South American Cross Country Championships took place on February 5–6, 2000.  The races were held in Cartagena de Indias, Colombia, jointly with the Central American and Caribbean Cross Country Championships.

Complete results, results for junior and youth competitions, and medal winners were published.

Medallists

South American Cross Country Championships

Central American and Caribbean Cross Country Championships
This is an unofficial extraction from the results.

Race results

Senior men's race (12 km)

Note: Athletes in parentheses did not score for the team result.

Men's short race (4 km)

†: Athlete marked as guest, but accounted for team score.

Note: Athletes in parentheses did not score for the team result.
†: Athlete marked as guest, but accounted for team score.

Junior (U20) men's race (8 km)

Note: Athletes in parentheses did not score for the team result.

Youth (U18) men's race (4 km)

Note: Athletes in parentheses did not score for the team result.

Senior women's race (8 km)

Note: Athletes in parentheses did not score for the team result.

Women's short race (4 km)

Note: Athletes in parentheses did not score for the team result.

Junior (U20) women's race (6 km)

Note: Athletes in parentheses did not score for the team result.

Youth (U18) women's race (3 km)

Note: Athletes in parentheses did not score for the team result.

Medal table (unofficial)

South American Cross Country Championships

Note: Totals include both individual and team medals, with medals in the team competition counting as one medal.

Central American and Caribbean Cross Country Championships

Note: Totals include both individual and team medals, with medals in the team competition counting as one medal.

Participation
According to an unofficial count, a total of 195 athletes from 16 countries participated.

South American Cross Country Championships
According to an unofficial count, 81 athletes from 7 countries were competing for the South American Cross Country Championships.

 (3)
 (23)
 (10)
 (20)
 (15)
 Panamá (5)
 (5)

Central American and Caribbean Cross Country Championships
According to an unofficial count, 86 athletes from 9 countries were competing for the Central American and Caribbean Cross Country Championships.  13 athletes from Colombia and 5 athletes from Panamá competed for both championships.

 (2)
 (13)
 (4)
 (11)
 (20)
 México (14)
 Panamá (5)
 (9)
 (8)

Guests
In addition, one African guest athlete, and 45 local Colombian athletes participated.

 (1)
 (45 local athletes)

See also
 2000 in athletics (track and field)

References

External links
 GBRathletics

South American Cross Country Championships
South American Cross Country Championships
South American Cross Country Championships
South American Cross Country Championships
Sport in Cartagena, Colombia
Cross country running in Colombia
February 2000 sports events in South America